The following is a list of characters that first appeared in the British soap opera Emmerdale Farm in 1972 and 1973, by order of first appearance. The first episode of Emmerdale Farm was broadcast on 16 October 1972. Marian Wilks is the first character to be seen on screen, riding her horse past Peggy Skilbeck who speaks the serial's first lines of dialogue asking her husband, Matt Skilbeck who Marian is. Peggy's widowed mother, Annie Sugden, brother, Joe Sugden and grandfather Sam Pearson are the next to be seen, preparing for Jacob's Sugden's funeral. Jack Sugden is seen in The Woolpack along with landlord Amos Brearly, watching his father's funeral procession go by. Following the funeral, Marian's father, Henry Wilks visits Annie to discuss right of way over adjoining land to Emmerdale Farm.

Janie Harker makes her first appearance on October 23. In November, Janie's sister, Ruth Merrick (later known as Pat), arrives along with her husband, Tom and their children Jackie and Sandie. Louise Jameson appears as Sharon Crossthwaite, as does Jim Latimer. The following month, Reverend Edward Ruskin makes his first appearance. In April, The serial's first birth occurs when Matt and Peggy's twins Sam and Sally are born. The serial's original doctor Clare Scott debuts in May and shopkeeper Lena Dawkins is introduced in December.

Marian Wilks

Marian Rosetti (also Wilks) was first played by Gail Harrison from 1972 to 1978, then by Debbie Blythe for two stints in 1987 and 1988. She first appeared on the show's first ever episode and was the first character to be seen on screen, riding on horseback. She was the daughter of wealthy retired factory owner Henry Wilks (Arthur Pentelow) who later ran the Woolpack with long standing landlord Amos Brearly (Ronald Magill). Marian embarked on a brief affair with Jack Sugden (Andrew Burt) in the first few months of the show.

Peggy Skilbeck

Peggy Skilbeck (née Sugden) was one of Emmerdales original characters, the second eldest child and only daughter of Jacob and
Annie Sugden, born on 28 August 1948. She was the first character to speak in the show; her line being "Matt, who's she?" Peggy married Matt Skilbeck in 1968 and had two children, twins Sam and Sally Skilbeck, in April 1973. Peggy died on 16 July 1973 of a brain haemorrhage at the age of 24.

Matt Skilbeck

Annie Sugden

Joe Sugden

Sam Pearson

Jack Sugden

Amos Brearly

Henry Wilks

Pat Sugden

Janie Harker

Janie Harker (also Blakey), played by Diane Grayson made her first appearance in the episode airing on 23 October 1972. When the character returned in 1986, she was played by Lesley Duff. Janie is the elder sister of Pat Sugden. Janie visits Joe Sugden in hospital, following his car crash and suggests he takes her out when he recovers but he declines. Later, Janie dates Frank Blakey a few times and the pair quickly become engaged and marry in March 1973. The following year, Janie discovers she is pregnant and neglects to tell Frank. However, Frank finds this out when Joe congratulates him on his child. Frank remains silent, allowing Janie to tell him about the baby in her own time. Ruth also returned to the village, having divorced her husband Tom and left the kids with him. She attempts suicide but is rescued, and Janie, Frank and Pat leave the village soon after. When Ruth, now known as Pat dies in a car accident in 1986, Janie returns to the village for the funeral.

Tom Merrick

Tom Merrick is the first husband of Ruth Harker (later known as Pat). He appeared in 1972, 1980–1982 and 1984–1986, followed by a brief reappearance in 1988 at Jackie Merrick's wedding.

Jackie Merrick was born just under seven months after the wedding in early November that year, although Tom believed he was the father and spent years bringing up Jackie. Pat even told Tom Jackie was born two months premature so Tom believed he was the father. Very little is known about his early background before his marriage to Pat but he had a sister and his mother was a friend of Annie Sugden.

Tom returns to the village in 1972 and picks a fight with Joe Sugden after seeing Joe and Pat together in "The Woolpack". Tom is suspicious of how Jackie bears a strong resemblance to Jack, as well as sharing his name, and Jack is later revealed as Jackie's father. Tom blackmails Jack when he finds out that he had been sleeping at Inglebrook while Henry Wilks was laid up, and Jack later fires Tom. The Merricks then move to Leeds to live near Tom's sister.

Pat, Jackie and hers and Tom's daughter Sandie Merrick return in 1980, having left Tom. He reappears later that year, a much nastier and more menacing man than in 1972, although Pat is now seeing Jack. Pat tells Tom that she wants a divorce and he hits her. Tom tries framing Jack for arson in 1981 but Jack has an alibi and is never charged. Seth Armstrong later forces Tom out of the village with threats of disclosure about the fire and Pat soon divorces him. Tom returns in 1982 and finds out the truth over Jackie's parentage. He has a fight with Jack outside the Woolpack. Tom thinks it is a bit too late to change his ways completely from his drinking, due to his age, and leaves for Aberdeen in February 1982. Tom returns a few years later when is persuaded to look after the farm while Jack and Pat keep a bedside vigil for Jackie, who is in a coma following an accident. By then we see a mellower side to the character. He returns in 1986 for Pat's funeral and made his final appearance in February 1988 at Jackie's wedding to Kathy Bates. He has not been seen or heard from since.

The second actor who played him, Edward Peel went on to play Tony Cairns in the late 1990s, making him the only actor in Emmerdales history to play two different characters in regular roles.

Jackie Merrick

John Jacob "Jackie" Merrick was played by Ian Sharrock from 1980 to 1989. Jackie was originally seen as a silent young boy (actor unknown) in the earliest episodes of Emmerdale Farm before becoming a fully-fledged regular character in September 1980. He is the son of Pat Merrick (originally Ruth), a former girlfriend of Jack Sugden. Jack had left the village in 1964 and Pat subsequently married Tom Merrick and made him believe he was the father, even claiming that Jackie was born prematurely, which was not the case. Jackie celebrated his 18th birthday in November 1982.

In 1985, Jackie almost died after being run over by Alan Turner while fixing his motorbike. During his slow recovery after waking from a coma, he finally acknowledged Jack as his father by referring to him as his father.

Jackie married Kathy Bates in 1988 but the marriage didn't last long as Jackie was killed the following year, in an accident while he and Seth Armstrong were hunting for a £10 bet. Jackie tried to take a shotgun out of his car, but it got caught and went off by mistake, killing him in the process. The character also had a brief fling with Angie Richards, who was played by Beverley Callard, now famous for her role as Liz McDonald in Coronation Street.

Sandie Merrick

Sandie Merrick was played by Jenny Mayors-Clark in 1972 and played by Jane Hutcheson from 1980–1983 and then again from 1984–1989, Sandie first arrived in Beckindale with her mother, father and half-brother in 1972 but left not long after. She later returned for good with her mother and half-brother in 1980.

Sandie found romance with Andy Longthorn (David Clayforth/Mark Botham) in 1982. Their love blossomed but he could not compete when Sandie was swept off her feet by agricultural student David Blakemore, who arrived in Beckindale in his flash car to help Joe Sugden (Frazer Hines) at NY Estates. Sandie then moved on to unemployed Graham Jelks, a keen mechanic who was a friend of her brother Jackie and Seth Armstrong's son, Fred.

When Sandie announced she was pregnant and refused to reveal who the father was, Dolly Skilbeck (Jean Rogers) gave her the support she needed. Only later was it discovered that Dolly herself had given birth to an illegitimate son years earlier.

The father of Sandie's baby was, in fact, Andy Longthorn (David Clayforth/Mark Botham), who had left the village to go to university. After deciding to have the baby but finding her mother, Pat Sugden, unsympathetic, Sandie joined her father, Tom, in Aberdeen where he was working on the oil rigs and gave birth to her daughter, Louise, away from the wagging tongues of Beckindale. Pat disapproved again when Sandie put Louise up for adoption and tried to rebuild her life.

There was more friction when builder Phil Pearce (Peter Alexander) left his wife, Lesley, and young daughter, Diane, to move with Sandie into Mill Cottage. The Mill had been converted into a flat by the company that Phil had just formed with Joe Sugden. Phil and Sandie started an affair which Diane unveiled to a packed audience in The Woolpack. Sandie's affair caused another village scandal, and Annie Sugden made her disapproval clear.

When Sandie subsequently passed her auctioneer's exams and took over Eric Pollard's (Chris Chittell) job, he mounted a hate campaign against her. It culminated in him breaking into the mill conversion she shared with Phil and drunkenly threatening her with a poker. Matters only worsened for Sandie when NY Estates decided to close Hotten Market and pull out of Beckindale altogether and she lost her job. Phil got involved in scams and this annoyed Sandie. They begun to drift apart and they split up in July 1988. She bought Phil out of the mill. Phil was later jailed for organising a robbery on Home Farm. In May 1989, Sandie left the village to live in Scotland with her father.

In December 1991, Sandie was mentioned when Frank Tate bought Mill Cottage from her.

In January 2006, Sandie was mentioned by her former step father Jack when he mentioned how she once dated Terence Turner.

Sharon Crossthwaite
{{Infobox soap character
|series=Emmerdale
|name=Sharon Crossthwaite
|portrayer=Louise Jameson
|introducer= Peter Holmans
|first=22 January 1973
|last=30 January 1973
|father=Ronnie Crossthwaite
|mother=Beryl Crossthwaite
|relatives=Annie SugdenJack SugdenPeggy SkilbeckJoe Sugden
|occupation=Hairdresser
|classification= Former; guest
|books= Emmerdale Farm: Prodigal's ProgressEmmerdale Farm: All That a Man Has|
}}
Sharon Crossthwaite is a cousin of Annie Sugden. She appeared in 1973. The daughter of Beryl Crossthwaite, Annie's second cousin, Sharon is raped and murdered by Jim Latimer. Sharon disappears after attending a sheep dog show. She is followed by Latimer who tries to attack her but is stopped by a homeless man, Ian "Trash" McIntyre, a friend of Jack Sugden. Jack let Trash stay with him but the police treat Trash as a suspect in Sharon's disappearance as he had some of her belongings. Trash later fell from a window at Mill Cottage and died from resulting injuries and Sharon's body is discovered shortly afterwards. Latimer is later arrested and charged with Sharon's murder and sentenced to life imprisonment. Sharon was the programme's first murder victim. Sharon's story is chronicled in the books Emmerdale Farm: Prodigal's Progress and Emmerdale Farm: All That a Man Has.

Jim Latimer

Jim Latimer (credited as Suedeman in 1991) is the killer of teenager Sharon Crosswaite (Louise Jameson). He rapes Sharon before killing her. He is arrested and later sentenced to life imprisonment. When he is released from prison, he kidnaps Sarah Connolly, who is in a relationship with Jack Sugden who was a prosecution witness at his trial in 1973. Sarah is saved by Jack and Latimer is arrested by the police.

Edward Ruskin

Edward Ruskin was first seen in the show during Sharon Crossthwaite's disappearance and revelation that she had been murdered. Jim Latimer confessed to Rev Ruskin that he had killed Sharon. Ruskin and his wife Liz lived at the vicarage in Beckindale. Ruskin and village churchwarden Wally Lumm had a disagreement in 1974 over divorced women joining the Women's Union.

In May 1975, Ruskin and his wife left the village after he was transferred to another parish. There was a nice send off for him at the village hall. Mr Matthews later became Rev Ruskin's replacement. Rev Ruskin was not seen in the village for the next 8 years.

In May 1983, Rev Ruskin returned to Beckindale as a stand in vicar for Rev Hinton when he was away. That was his final visit to the village. He was never seen again in the village.

Sam Skilbeck

Sam Skilbeck, played by Jamie Bell made his debut screen appearance on 10 April 1973.

Sam is the son of Matt and Peggy Skilbeck. He appeared for three years from 1973 to 1976. Along with his twin sister Sally Skilbeck, he was one of the first births in Emmerdale Farm. Born in 1973 along with Sally, Sam is named after his great-grandfather Sam Pearson. Peggy dies three months after his birth of a brain haemorrhage. Matt and Peggy's mother Annie Sugden help bring up the twins but she's unable to cope with Sam and Sally and so sends them to live with his aunt, Beattie Dowton. On 13 January 1976, Beattie, Sam and Sally are killed when a train strikes her car on a level crossing. Following their deaths, Matt mentions them until his departure in 1991. Annie is informed by telephone and Matt is informed by police. In 1982, Matt has another son by his second wife Dolly Skilbeck and he is named Samuel Skilbeck after Sam. Sam is delighted.

Sally Skilbeck

Sally Skilbeck, played by Justine Bell is the daughter of Matt and Peggy Skilbeck. She appeared from 1973 to 1976. Along with her twin brother Sam Skilbeck, she is the first birth of Emmerdale Farm''.

Sally is born in 1973 along with Sam. Peggy dies three months after her birth of a brain haemorrhage. Matt and Peggy's mother Annie Sugden help bring up the twins but she's unable to cope with Sam and Sally and so sends them to live with his aunt, Beattie Dowton. On 13 January 1976, Beattie, Sam and Sally are killed when a train strikes her car on a level crossing. Annie is informed by telephone and Matt is informed by police. Following their deaths, Matt mentions them until his departure in 1991.

Clare Scott

Dr Clare Scott, played by Joanna Tope, made her first appearance on 12 May 1973 and departed on 22 October 1973.  Clare Scott takes over as the local doctor of Beckindale from Doctor Maurice Grant, following his retirement. Clare develops a friendship with Jack Sugden. Clare's boyfriend Simon arrives in Beckindale, and proposes to her but she rejects him. Clare is last seen attending church but continues to be referred to as still living in the village.

Christine Sharp

Christine Sharp (previously Sugden) is the first wife of Joe Sugden. She appeared from 1973 to 1974 and in 1976.

Only months after marrying Joe, Christine left because she did not want to be a farmer's wife. She returned two years later, hoping for a new start with Joe but when he asked for a divorce, she left Beckindale for good. In 1995, she sent flowers to Joe's funeral.

Lena Dawkins

Mrs Dawkins was first seen in late 1973 in the shop chatting to Alison Gibbons. She was a no nonsense lady. In early 1975 Norah Norris had to rush off and left Mrs Dawkins in charge of the shop. Norah later left and Mrs Dawkins took over the running of Beckindale's shop and post office. She disrupted Wilf Padgett from his work adding the post office as he claimed she talked too much. Lena took no nonsense from anybody, even her boss Henry Wilks. She was last seen in February 1976 and left the shop in between then and 1988 when a Mrs Robson ran the place.

Other characters

References

1972
, Emmerdale
, Emmerdale